Faulkner House, also known as Seymour, Montesano, Garallen, and Old Ivy Inn, is a historic home located near Charlottesville, Albemarle County, Virginia.  It was built in 1855–1856, and enlarged and remodeled in 1907 in the Colonial Revival style under the direction of architect Waddy B. Wood. The original section is the central two-story, brick structure topped by a hipped roof.  In 1907, the house was enlarged with the addition of recessed, two-story, single-pile side wings and monumental front portico.  Toward the end of the American Civil War, the house served as temporary headquarters of Union General Thomas Devin and was the home of Senator Thomas S. Martin from 1906 to 1919.

It was added to the National Register of Historic Places in 1984.

References

Houses on the National Register of Historic Places in Virginia
Colonial Revival architecture in Virginia
Houses completed in 1907
Houses in Albemarle County, Virginia
National Register of Historic Places in Albemarle County, Virginia